Liu Miaomiao (born 1962 in Guyuan, Ningxia) is a Chinese film director. Liu, a Hui Muslim, was the youngest member of the 1982 class of the Beijing Film Academy, commonly referred to as the Fifth Generation. Her career has spanned both film and television, though she remains less well known than many of her male counterparts to international audiences.

Career 
Liu graduated from the BFA's directing program, in which she enrolled at the age of sixteen, along with directors such as Tian Zhuangzhuang and Chen Kaige. Upon graduation, she was assigned to the Xiaoxing Film Studio where she directed her first solo work, Stories of the Voyage in 1985 at the age of 23.

In 1987, she directed the war film Women on the Long March, about eight female Red Army soldiers who find themselves separated from their main force during the Long March. In the early 1990s, Liu filmed two important works, 1993's Chatterbox, and 1994's Family Scandal (co-directed with Cui Xiaoqin). Both films garnered international notice, particularly the former, which won an award at the Venice International Film Festival. Chatterbox was a personal work as well, with Liu receiving no salary for the film and borrowing heavily to bring it to an international venue.

Liu Miaomiao has also shifted her career into filming television programs and films.

Selected filmography

References

External links 
 
 Liu Miaomiao at the Chinese Movie Database

1962 births
Living people
Film directors from Ningxia
Chinese women film directors
Hui people
People from Guyuan
Beijing Film Academy alumni